Sing Blue Silver is a documentary about Duran Duran's 1983-1984 World Tour directed by Michael Collins. A sixty-minute edited version of the documentary was aired on MTV (and later other music channels) under the title Blue Silver.

Sing Blue Silver was originally released on videotape (in VHS and Betamax formats) and on LaserDisc, near the end of 1984. It was re-issued on DVD in April 2004. A 1984 book of the same name featured still photography by official tour photographer Denis O'Regan.
The title comes from a verse from the song "The Chauffeur", released in 1982. It was certified gold by the RIAA (Billboard magazine week ending February 23, 1985).

Synopsis
Filmed at the height of their fame, Sing Blue Silver follows Duran Duran around Canada and the United States for three months from 30 January to 17 April 1984 as they toured in support of their Seven and the Ragged Tiger album around North America.

Primarily, Sing Blue Silver is about the job of making music, so live musical performances feature quite heavily throughout the video.

The documentary features many other standout moments, including a Francesco Scavullo photo shoot in New York, meeting a couple of L.A. Raiders players backstage, and a Beatles-style press conference tinged with a bit of comedy. It also captures the band in more candid moments, from backstage antics to trying to stay entertained on the journey between cities.

The film also documented the band's teen idol status, showing hordes of hysterical young — mainly female — fans attempting to cope with seeing their heroes in a live arena.

Live footage from this tour was later used for the Arena (An Absurd Notion) long-form video and the As The Lights Go Down concert video. The video for "The Reflex" was shot at Maple Leaf Gardens in Toronto on March 5, 1984.

Michael Collins left the tour after the first few weeks.

DVD Track Listing
 Intro
 Press Conference
 Load In/Backstage
 Is There Something I Should Know?
 Meeting the L.A. Raiders
 On The Road Again/Planet Earth
 John on Touring
 Simon & Nick on Image & Recording 
 In New York
 Francesco Scavullo: Photo Shoot
 Back on the road
 Girls on Film
 Coca-Cola Press Conference
 Visit to the F.B.I.
 Discussing Filming/The Seventh Stranger
 In New Orleans
 Save a Prayer
 Oakland, California
 Soundcheck/Backstage
 Hungry Like The Wolf
 Careless Memories
 The End of the Tour
 Credits

References

External links
 
 Duran Duran Timeline: 1984
 Denis O'Regan – official Sing Blue Silver tour photographer and author of Sing Blue Silver official book
 AllMovie review

Duran Duran video albums
Documentary films about pop music and musicians
1984 films
British musical films
1980s British films